The City of Parañaque in the Philippines has a diverse educational system with specializations in various academic and technical fields and is home to many schools and colleges.

Universities and Colleges

AMA Computer University - Dr. A. Santos Avenue, San Isidro
Asian Institute of Computer Studies (AICS), Bicutan Branch - 1571 Triangle Bldg., Doña Soledad Avenue, Better Living Subdivision, Don Bosco
College of Divine Wisdom, Parañaque - AMVEl Business Park, Brgy. San Dionisio, Sucat
Datamex Institute of Computer Technology College of Saint Adeline - Dr. A. Santos Avenue, Sucat
Don Bosco Center of Studies - Michael Rua Street corner Israel Street, Better Living Subdivision, Don Bosco
GoTec International Business School - Block 5, Lot 9, Saint Paul Street, Lopez Village
Immaculate Heart of Mary College Parañaque - St. Dominic Savio Street, Better Living Subdivision, Don Bosco
Informatics Computer College - Brgy. Don Bosco Tricycle Terminal Bldg., Better Living Subd., West Bicutan
InfoTech College of Art - Dr. A. Santos Avenue, San Dionisio
Flight School International - Dr. A. Santos Avenue, Sucat
Olivarez College - Dr. A. Santos Avenue, Sucat
Parañaque City College - Corner Coastal Road, Victor Medina Street, Brgy. San Dionisio
PATTS College of Aeronautics - Lombos Avenue, San Isidro
Polytechnic University of the Philippines, Parañaque - Brgy.  Sto.  Niño
Premiere Computer Learning Center - Dr. A. Santos Avenue, San Dionisio
St. Augustine School of Nursing - Dr. A. Santos Avenue, San Dionisio
Polytechnic University of the Philippines, Parañaque - Col. E. de Leon Street, Brgy. Sto. Niño
STI College - Dr. A. Santos Avenue corner Palanyag Road, Sucat
Universal Colleges of Parañaque, Inc. - Dr. A. Santos Avenue, Sucat

Public Secondary
Baclaran National High School - Bagong Buhay Street, Brgy. Baclaran
Don Bosco National High School - El Dorado Dulo, Better Living Subdivision, Brgy. Don Bosco
Dr. Arcadio Santos National High School - Kilometer 15, East Service Road, South Superhighway, Brgy. San Martin de Porres
La Huerta National High School - Marcelo H. del Pilar Street, Brgy. La Huerta
Marcelo Green High School - 37 Dama De Noche, Ups IV, Brgy. Marcelo Green Paranaque City
Masville National High School - Masville, Brgy. BF Homes
Moonwalk National High School - St. Mary's Daang Batang Street, San Agustin Village, Brgy. Moonwalk
Parañaque National High School (Main) - Dr. A. Santos Avenue corner Kay Talise Street, Brgy. San Dionisio
Parañaque National High School (Baclaran Annex) - Pinaglabanan Street, Brgy. Baclaran
Parañaque National High School (Don Galo Annex) - Santa Monica Street, Brgy. Don Galo
Parañaque National High School (San Isidro Annex) - United Parañaque Subdivision V, Brgy. San Isidro
Parañaque National High School (Tambo Annex) - NAIA road, Brgy. Tambo
Parañaque Science High School - Col. E. de Leon Street, Brgy. Sto. Niño
San Antonio High School Parañaque - Hontiveros Cmpd., Fourth Estate Subdivision, Brgy. San Antonio
Sun Valley National High School - Elizabeth Avenue, Sapang Maligaya, Brgy. Sun Valley
Sto. Niño National High School - Col. E. de Leon Street, Brgy. Sto. Niño

Private Secondary
Agape Young Achievers Christian Academy, Inc. (A.Y.A.C.A.I.) - 4 and 5 Paglinawan St., Sunrise Drive, Fourth Estate Subdivision, Brgy. San Antonio, Sucat
Ann Arbor Montessori Learning Center, Inc. - El Grande Avenue, BF Homes
Arandia College - Block 1, Lot 1, Valarao Street, Airport Village Moonwalk
Blessed Adelheid Academy, Inc. - 6283 Daang Batang St. Moonwalk
Christian Harvest Academy Foundation, Inc. - Bougainville Road, Sun Valley Subdivision, Sun Valley
Create and Learning Paths School - 29 Calcutta St., Merville Park
Davidville Academy, Inc. - St. Paul Street, Lopez Village, Sucat
En Fuego Christian Academy, Inc. - A. Aguirre Avenue, BF Homes
Escuela de San Dionisio - Quirino Avenue, San Dionisio
Escuela de San Lorenzo Ruiz - Sanchez Avenue, Greenheights Subdivision, Sucat
Father Simpliciano Academy - Malacañang Drive, Better Living Subd.
God's Heritage Christian Academy - Quirino Avenue, Don Galo
Golden Achiever's Academy of Parañaque (formerly Hansel and Gretel Academy) - Andrew corner Apallos Streets, Better Living Subdivision, Don Bosco
Golden Values School - V. Buencamino Street, Sinagtala Village, BF Homes
Good Christian of Faith Academy - Sun Valley Drive, Sun Valley Subdivision, Sun Valley
Great Christian Academy Foundation, Inc. - Sun Valley Drive, Sun Valley Subdivision, Sun Valley
Holy Francis School of Parañaque, Inc. - Franciscan Servites, Multinational Avenue, Multinational Village, Moonwalk
Immaculate Heart of Mary College-Parañaque - St. Dominic Savio Street, Better Living Subdivision, Don Bosco
International Christian Academy - Lot 4505 Extra Street, Fourth Estate Subdivision, San Antonio
Katrina Solano Institute of Learning, Inc. - J. Elizalde St., BF Homes
Kids Choice Learning Academy, Inc. (Kids Choice Learning Center) - E. Aguinaldo Street, Malacañang Village, San Antonio
Legacy Christian Academy, Inc. - Block 2, Lot 30, Don Pedro Southwind Estate, Sucat
Lighthouse Bible Believer's Christian Academy - Justice Hugo Street, Sector 10, BF Homes
LH Montessori High, Inc. - 39 Press Drive, Fourth Estate Subdivision, San Antonio
Lifeline Foundation South City Central School (LF-SCCS) - 86 Aguirre Ave., BF Homes
Le-sil Montessori School - Dr. Arcadio Santos Avenue, San Isidro
Mace Learning Center - El Grande Ave., BF Homes
Manresa School - Candida Maria Street, BF Homes
Mace Learning Center - El Grande Ave., BF Homes
Madre Maria Pia Notari School, Inc. - Simon St. Multinational Village
Maria Montessori Children's School Foundation, Inc.- Off Madrid St., E. Nery Street, Merville Park Subdivision, Paranaque City (Entrance via Merville Park Gate 1), 1709 Metro Manila, Philippines
Mary Heights Learning Center, Inc. - Severina Avenue, Kilometer 18, Marcelo Green
Mary Immaculate School, Inc. - Sta. Natividad Street, San Antonio Valley, San Isidro
Marymount School - J. Villaroman Street, Classic Homes Village, BF Homes
Marymount Academy Better Living - Mary Help Of Christians St., Brgy. Don Bosco, Parañaque
Marymount Academy San Antonio - San Antonio Valley 1, Sucat
Montessori de Manila - Pablo Roman Street, BF Homes Executive Village, BF Homes
Neo BrightSide Christian Academy - Aguirre Ave., BF Homes
Olivarez College - Dr. A. Santos Avenue, Sucat
Our Lady of Carmel Educational Center, Inc. - Ramona Tirona Street, Phase I, BF Homes
Paulo Scholastic Chastity de Montessori Academy, Inc. - Block 6, Lot 33 and 34, Japan corner Jamaica Streets, Better Living Subdivision, Don Bosco
Periwinkle Hillcrest School, Inc. - Cecillia Curve, Don Jose Green Court, Sucat
Philippians Academy of Paranaque Inc. - 1314 Borman, Parañaque, 1709 Metro Manila
Philippine Christian School of Tomorrow - MJS Avenue, Levitown Executive Village, Don Bosco
Ramon Pascual Institute - Dr. A. Santos Avenue, Sucat
Regina Maria Montessori - Mendoza Street, Villa Mendoza Subdivision, Sucat
Regis Grace Montessori School - Daang Hari Street, Marian Lakeview Park, San Martin de Porres
Rogationist College of Parañaque - San Dionisio, Sucat
Sacred Heart School - Madre Isabella de Rosis Street, Multinational Village, Moonwalk
Seed Cosmic Academy, Inc. - West Service Road, Sun Valley
Shekinah Christian Training Center - Kirishima Street, BF Homes
Southfields International Christian Academe Centrum (SICAC) - Amity Ext., Better Living, Brgy. Don Bosco Paranaque
St. Andrew's School - Quirino Avenue, La Huerta
St. Cyr Academy - Dr. A. Santos Avenue, Sucat
St. Francis Academy - Dr. A. Santos Avenue, Sucat
St. John Paul II Academy of Parañaque - Gladiola Street, Marimar Village II, Bicutan
St. Paul College of Parañaque - Quirino Avenue, La Huerta
Sucat Evangelical Christian Academy - San Antonio Avenue, San Antonio Valley, San Isidro
Sun Valley Montessori Foundation, Inc. - Benedictine Street, Sta. Ana Village, Sun Valley
The Master's Academy Foundation, Inc. - Kilometer 16, West Service Road, Bicutan
United Christian Academy, Inc. - Highlight Street, Area 4, Fourth Estate Subdivision, San Antonio
UP South School - Rainbow Drive, Goodwill II Subdivision, BF Homes
Veritas Parochial School - Gil Puyat Street, Phase I, BF Homes
Ville Saint John Academy - Maharlika Avenue, Phase V, Marcelo Green Village, Marcelo Green

Public Elementary
Baclaran Elementary School Central - Pinaglabanan Street, Baclaran
Baclaran Elementary School Unit I - Pinaglabanan Street, Baclaran
Baclaran Elementary School Unit II - Santiago Street, Baclaran
Camp Claudio Elementary School - C. Santos Street
Col. E. de Leon Elementary School - Purok 7, Moonwalk
Don Galo Elementary School - J. Gabriel Street, Don Galo
F. Serrano, Sr. Elementary School - John Street, Don Bosco
Fourth Estate Elementary School (Parañaque Elementary School Unit III) - Fame Street, Fourth Estate Subdivision, San Antonio
La Huerta Elementary School - Ninoy Aquino Avenue, La Huerta
Marcelo Green Elementary School - 37 Dama De Noche, Ups IV, Brgy. Marcelo Green Paranaque City
Moonwalk Elementary School
Masville Elementary School - Masville Avenue, BF Homes
Parañaque Central Elementary School - Kabihasnan Street, San Dionisio
Parañaque Elementary School Unit II - Kabihasnan Street, San Dionisio
Parañaque Elementary School Unit III - Silverio Compound, San Isidro
Rogelio G. Gatchalian Elementary School - Don Juan Street, Vitalez
Sampaloc Site II Elementary School - Guyabano Street, Sampaloc Site II BF Homes
San Agustin Elementary School - E. Rodriguez Avenue, San Agustin Village, Moonwalk
San Antonio Elementary School (Parañaque Elementary School Unit IV) - Santa Lucia Street, San Antonio
San Antonio Elementary School - Silverio Annex - Silverio Compound, Brgy. San Isidro
San Isidro Elementary School - UPS V, Brgy. San Isidro
San Dionisio Elementary School (Parañaque Elementary School Unit I) - Kabihasnan Street, San Dionisio
Sto. Niño Elementary School - J.P. Rizal Street, Sto. Niño
Sun Valley Elementary School - Elizabeth Avenue, Sun Valley
Tambo Elementary School Main - NAIA Road, Tambo
Tambo Elementary School Unit I - C. Santos Street, Tambo

Private Elementary
Abenton Learning Center Philippines, Moonwalk
Agape Young Achievers Christian Academy, Inc. (A.Y.A.C.A.I.) - 4 and 5 Paglinawan St., Area 4 Compound, Sunrise Drive, Fourth Estate, Brgy. San Antonio.
Ann Arbor Montessori Learning Center, Inc. - El Grande Avenue, BF Homes
Arandia College - Block 1, Lot 1, F. Valarao Street, Airport Village, Brgy. Moonwalk
Beginners Mind Montessori House Kindergarten School - Jerusalem St., Multinational Village, Brgy. Moonwalk
Betty's Vermillion Academy - 10th Street, United Parañaque Subdivision No. 5
Blessed Adelheid Academy, Inc. - No. 6283 Daang Batang St. Brgy. Moonwalk
Blessed Luisa School, Inc. - San Gabriel Street, San Antonio Valley, San Isidro
Blessed Margaret Educational Center, Inc. - J. Elizalde Street, BF Homes
Brainshire Science School - J. Gabriel Street, Baclaran
Bridge School - 29 Cairo Street, BF Northwest Parañaque
Center of Hope for Integrated Learning and Development - T. Teodoro Street, Sinagtala Village, BF Homes
Children of Light Foundation, Inc. - 4455 Bernardo Square, Annex 29-32, Better Living Subdivision, Don Bosco
Christ Child School - Salvador Street, San Dionisio
CSA Learning Center - San Roque Street, San Agustin Valley
Create and Learning Paths School - 29 Calcutta St., Merville Park
Creative Minds Learning and Therapy Center - 443 El Grande Avenue, BF Homes
Christian Faith Academy of Better Living, Inc. - Peru St., Better Living
Davidville Academy, Inc. - St. Paul Street, Lopez Village
En Fuego Christian Academy, Inc. - A. Aguirre Avenue, BF Homes
Escuela de San Dionisio - Quirino Avenue, San Dionisio
Escuela de San Lorenzo Ruiz - Sanchez Avenue, Greenheights Subdivision, Sucat
Father Simpliciano Academy - Malacañang Drive, Better Living Subdivision, Don Bosco
Francis Possenti Tutorial and Learning Center - Sun Valley Drive, Sun Valley Subdivision, Sun Valley
Gemille School, Inc. - St. Jude corner St. Andrew Streets, Lopez Village, Sucat
Genesis Learning Academy - Evacom, Sucat
Gift of Advanced Learning (GOAL) Montessori School - Lavender Street, Sun Valley Subdivision, Sun Valley
Golden Achievers' Academy of Parañaque (formerly Hansel and Gretel Academy) - Andrew corner Apallos Streets, Better Living Subdivision, Don Bosco
Golden Values School - V. Buencamino Street, Sinagtala Village, BF Homes
Grace Special School, Inc. - Stanfford Street, Moonwalk
Great Christian Academy Foundation, Inc. - Sun Valley Drive, Sun Valley Subdivision, Sun Valley
Greatstart International School Manila - 187 Dona Soledad Ave Ext., Better Living Subdivision, Don Bosco
Holy Child Angels Learning Center of Parañaque - Sampaguita Street, Matatdo Homes, Sucat
Holy Francis School of Parañaque, Inc. - Franciscan Servites, Multinational Avenue, Multinational Village, Moonwalk
Holy Mary of Guadalupe Development School - Sun Valley Dr. Sun Valley
Immaculate Heart of Mary College-Parañaque - St. Dominic Savio Street, Better Living Subdivision, Don Bosco
John Shannon Montessori - President Quezon Street, Teoville Subdivision, BF Homes
Katrina Solano Institute of Learning, Inc. - J. Elizalde St., BF Homes
Kids Choice Montessori Academy, Inc. (Kids Choice Learning Center) - E. Aguinaldo Street, Malacañang Village, San Antonio
Kidsville Creative Systems, Inc. - Canada corner Ceylon Streets, Better Living Subdivision, Don Bosco
Kinder Care Learning Center, Inc. - Concha Cruz Drive, BF Homes
Kinder Trail Learning Center - 47 Ghana St. Section IV, Better Living Subdivision
Learn and Play Montessori - Marcelo Avenue, Phase 3, Marcelo Green Village, Marcelo Green
Learning Garden Montessori School - Aguirre Avenue, BF Homes
Legacy Christian Academy, Inc. - Block 2, Lot 30, Don Pedro Southwind Estate, Sucat
L'Enfant Scuola (The Child's School) - Dama de Noche Street, Tahanan Village, BF Homes
Le-Sil Montessori School - Creek Drive, Dr. A. Santos Avenue, Sucat
LH Montessori High, Inc. - 39 Press Drive, Fourth Estate Subdivision, Brgy. San Antonio
Lifeline Foundation South City Central School (LF-SCCS) - 86 Aguirre Ave., BF Homes
Lighthouse Bible Believer's Christian Academy - Justice Hugo Street, Sector 10, BF Homes
Little Friends Academy, Inc. - Venice Street, Better Living Subdivision, Don Bosco
Mace Learning Center - El Grande Ave., BF Homes
Madre Maria Pia Notari School, Inc. - #70 Timothy / Simon Street, Multinational Village, Moonwalk
Mano Amiga Academy - L3B Levitown Avenue, Brgy. Don Bosco, Betterliving Subdivision, Paranaque City
Manresa School - Candida Maria Street, BF Homes
Maria Montessori Children's School Foundation, Inc.- Off Madrid St., E. Nery Street, Merville Park Subdivision, Paranaque City (Entrance via Merville Park Gate 1), 1709 Metro Manila, Philippines
Martyr's Ecumenical School - Quirino Avenue, Tambo
Mary Heights Learning Center, Inc. - Severina Avenue, Kilometer 18, Marcelo Green
Mary Immaculate School, Inc. - Sta. Natividad Street, San Antonio Valley, San Isidro
Mary Louis Montessori School, Inc. - El Dorado Avenue, Levitown Executive Village, Don Bosco
Marymount School - J. Villaroman Street, Classic Homes Village, BF Homes
Marymount Academy Better Living - Mary Help Of Christians St., Brgy. Don Bosco, Parañaque
Merville Sacred Heart School - Vienna Street, Merville
Mon-El Learning Center - Mangga Street, Mon-El Subdivision, Sucat
Montessori de Manila - Pablo Roman Street, BF Homes Executive Village, BF Homes 
Mother of Divine Grace School of Parañaque, Inc. - A. Pissionist Street, Santa Ana Village
Mother Maria Maddalena Starace School Incorporated - 42 Russia Street, Don Bosco , Better Living Subdivision , 1711 Paranaque City , Metro Manila
Olivarez College - Dr. A. Santos Avenue, Sucat
Nativity House of Learning - 533 Quirino Avenue corner Librada Avelino Street, Brgy. Tambo
Neo BrightSide Christian Academy - Aguirre Ave., BF Homes
Our Lady of Carmel Educational Center, Inc. - Ramona Tirona Street, Phase I, BF Homes
Our Lady of Carmel School - Sta. Rita Parish Compound, Quirino Avenue, Baclaran
Our Lady of Unity Parochial School - 11th Street, United Parañaque Subdivision, San Martin de Porres
Palm Crest School - Palm Spring Street, Merville
Parañaque Risen Christ School - St. Francis Street, San Agustin Village, Moonwalk
Parish Learning Center of San Antonio de Padua, Inc. - San Antonio de Padua Parish, San Antonio Village, Sucat
Paulo Scholastic Chastity de Montessori Academy, Inc. - Block 6, Lot 33 and 34, Japan corner Jamaica Streets, Better Living Subdivision, Don Bosco
Pean Integrated School of Parañaque, Inc. - 235 Aldrin Street, Moonwalk Village
Philippians Academy of Paranaque Inc. - 1314 Borman, Parañaque, 1709 Metro Manila
Philippine Christian School of Tomorrow - MJS Avenue, Levitown Executive Village, Don Bosco
Regina Maria Montessori - Mendoza Street, Villa Mendoza Subdivision, Sucat
Richfield Child Development Center, Inc. - #149 Multinational Avenue, Multinational Village
Rogationist College of Parañaque - San Dionisio, Sucat
Sacred Heart School - Madre Isabella de Rosis Street, Multinational Village, Moonwalk
Scuola Figlie de Maria Immaculata, Inc. - Doña Irenea Street, Ireneville Subdivision I, BF Homes
Shekinah Christian Training Center - Kirishima Street, BF Homes
South Merville School - Montclair Street, Merville Park, Merville
Southfields International Christian Academe Centrum (SICAC) - Amity Ext., Better Living, Brgy. Don Bosco Paranaque
St. Agatha Academy, Inc. - Dr. A. Santos Avenue, Sucat
St. Andrew's School - Quirino Avenue, La Huerta
St. Cyr Academy - Dr. A. Santos Avenue, Sucat
St. Dionysus School, Inc. - Irasan Street, San Dionisio
St. Dominic Savio Learning Center, Inc. - Magnolia Street, Camella Classic Homes, Don Bosco
St. Francis Academy - Dr. A. Santos Avenue, Sucat
St. Gabriel Academy of Parañaque - Quirino Avenue, Baclaran
St. John Paul II Academy of Parañaque - Gladiola Street, Marimar Village II, Bicutan
St. Jude Educational Play and Tutorial Center - Ramona Tirona Street, BF Homes
St. Leonard Academy of Parañaque, Inc. - Immaculate Street, Remmaville Subdivision, Sucat
St. Martin de Porres Kindergarten School - Narra Street, United Parañaque Subdivision, San Martin de Porres
St. Paul College of Parañaque - Quirino Avenue, La Huerta
St. Raymond's Nursery and Kindergarten School - Saudi Arabia Street, Better Living Subdivision, Don Bosco
St. Theresa de Avila School of Parañaque - Dr. A. Santos Avenue, Sucat
Sun Valley Montessori Foundation, Inc. - Benedictine Street, Sta. Ana Village, Sun Valley
The Center of Creative Concepts for Children - Mangga Street, Marcelo Green Village, Marcelo Green
United Christian Academy, Inc. - Highlight Street, Area 4, Fourth Estate Subdivision, San Antonio
UP South School - Rainbow Drive, Goodwill II Subdivision, BF Homes
UP South School Extension (Fourth Estate Branch) - Sunrise Drive, Fourth Estate, Brgy. San Antonio
Veritas Parochial School - Gil Puyat Street, Phase I, BF Homes
Ville Saint John Academy - Maharlika Avenue, Phase V, Marcelo Green Village, Marcelo Green F.
World of Wonder Preschool - Russia Street, Better Living Subdivision, Brgy. Don Bosco

International schools
Australia International School Manila - Dr. A. Santos Ave., Brgy. BF Homes, Sucat
European International School (Deutsche Europäische Schule Manila; Lycée Français de Manille)
Greatstart International School Manila - 187 Dona Soledad Ave Ext., Better Living Subdivision, Don Bosco
The King's School, Manila - Aseana City
Singapore School Manila - Aseana City

Former schools
Centro Escolar University Parañaque - Librada Avelino St. Tambo
Christian Harvest Academy (moved to ARCA South Complex Taguig; now closed in 2022)
Euro Campus International School - Levitown Subd., Brgy. Don Bosco, Parañaque City (now currently replaced by Philippine Christian School Of Tomorrow from Alabang, Muntinlupa City)
 Informatics College Bicutan - SM City Bicutan Annex Bldg., Better Living Subdivision, Brgy. Don Bosco, Paranaque City
Jesu Mariae International School (now currently occupied and replaced by Marymount Academy Better Living)
Jose Maria Escriva Academy, Fourth Estate Subdivision (due to lack of business permit)
Languages International Culture Academy (BRYN LICA) (moved to Las Piñas)
Lycée D'Regis Marie School - Dr. A. Santos Avenue, Sucat (due to land title conflict)
Parañaque City College of Science and Technology - Kabihasnan Street, San Dionisio
South Merville School - Montclair Street, Merville Park, Merville
STI Academy of Parañaque
St. James College of Parañaque (moved to Quezon City)
St. Rita College Parañaque City
The Learning Child School (moved to Ayala Alabang)

See also
List of schools in Metro Manila (primary and secondary)
List of international schools in Metro Manila
List of universities and colleges in Metro Manila

Paranaque